The Virginia Tech Hokies football team has had 146 players drafted into the National Football League (NFL) since the league began holding drafts in 1936. This includes eleven players taken in the first round and two overall number one picks, Bruce Smith in the 1985 NFL Draft and Michael Vick in the 2001 NFL Draft. Fifteen former Virginia Tech players have been selected to a Pro Bowl, thirteen have won a championship with their respective teams and one has been elected to the Pro Football Hall of Fame.

Each NFL franchise seeks to add new players through the annual NFL Draft. The draft rules were last updated in 2009. The team with the worst record the previous year picks first, the next-worst team second, and so on. Teams that did not make the playoffs are ordered by their regular-season record with any remaining ties broken by strength of schedule. Playoff participants are sequenced after non-playoff teams, based on their round of elimination (wild card, division, conference, and Super Bowl). Prior to the merger agreements in 1966, the American Football League (AFL) operated in direct competition with the NFL and held a separate draft. This led to a bidding war over top prospects between the two leagues. As part of the merger agreement on June 8, 1966, the two leagues held a multiple round "Common Draft". Once the AFL officially merged with the NFL in 1970, the "Common Draft" became the NFL Draft.

Key

Selections

American Football League

National Football League

Notes

Notable undrafted players
Note: No drafts held before 1920

References
General

 
 
 

Specific

Virginia Tech

Virginia Tech Hokies NFL Draft